Syedwala is a historical city in the Nankana Sahib District of Punjab, Pakistan. It is the new tehsil of the Nankana Sahib District.Total population of Teshil is 102,185 as per 2017 census

Geography 
The town lies on the banks of the Ravi River in Nankana Sahib, and connects the Faisalabad District, Sheikhupura District, and Okara District. A bridge spans the Ravi River there.

History 
Sher Shah Suri laid the foundation of Syedwala while he was in power. Suri was interested in building new cities, roads and buildings according to military requirements. When his Army passed by Syedwala, he recognized the area as a hub point for Punjab. The Ravi River's presence encourage  him to build a city there.  
Syedwala old name is nanak chand  
Immigrants were drawn to the city due to its safety, cleanliness, and the fact that it was directly governed by Suri. Syedwala became a home for trade and art throughout the region.

In 1661, when Mughal Ruler Muhi-ud-Din Muhammad Aurangzeb was the ruler of the sub-continent, a great flood destroyed the city. A new Syedwala was then constructed 3 miles away. Syedwala quickly excelled again in the fields of art and culture and  became a trading hub. In 1804, Maharaja Ranjeet Singh took over Syedwala. Until the rule of the British Empire, Syedwala remained in the hands of Sikhs.

Timeline
From 1813 to 1849, Syedwala remained a part of Jhang Province.
1849: became a part of the District Pakpattan.
1855: merged in Gogera Tehsil.
1864: became a part of Montgomery Sahiwal.
1881: was class 3 town Municipal Committee. At that time Sheikhupura was a small village.
1913: merged into District Lyallpur (Faisalabad) including its 137 villages.
1922: merged both into District Sheikhupura and Nankana Sahib simultaneously.
2005: became part of Nankana Sahib District

Flood

This city was destroyed by flood in three stages. The first flood in 1920 ruined one-third of the city. The second flood demolished half of the city in 1940. The whole city vanished in the flood in 1957-1958. At that time, the population was 3156.

Although the city remained safe, the flood produced a great panic and disturbance among the peoples of New Syedwala.

Industries
Rice factories (07)
Ice factories (03)
Poultry farms (15)

Transportation
Syedwala is 11 Km from Jaranwala-interchange on  Exit-4 M-3 motorway (Pakistan).

References

Populated places in Nankana Sahib District